Johan Randulf Bull (29 April 1749 – 28 February  1829) was a Norwegian judge.

He was born in Stod, as the brother of Johan Lausen Bull. He took the jurist examination in Copenhagen in 1778, and was a member of Det Norske Selskab there. He played the role figure "Mads" at the premiere of Johan Herman Wessel's satirical play Kierlighed uden Strømper in 1772.

From 1802 he was County Governor of Søndre Bergenhus Amt (today named Hordaland). He was instrumental in organising the defence of Bergen during the war with Great Britain in 1807.

In 1814, at the advent of Norwegian national independence, he was appointed the first Chief Justice of the Supreme Court of Norway. The court was operative from 1815. He left in 1827. He died two years later in Larvik.

He was the father of Georg Jacob Bull, who followed in his father's footsteps as Chief Justice from 1836 to 1854.

In 1817 Bull, together with minister Niels Treschow and Nicolay Erik Arbin (1743–1825) initiated a revival of The Norwegian Society in Christiania.

Bull became Knight, Order of the Dannebrog (RDO) in 1811. He was Knight of the Order of the Polar Star (RNO) from 1815, and received the Grand Cross (KmstkNO) in 1818.

References

External links 
Family genealogy

1749 births
1829 deaths
County governors of Norway
Chief justices of Norway
University of Copenhagen alumni
18th-century Norwegian civil servants
19th-century Norwegian judges
Commanders Grand Cross of the Order of the Polar Star
Knights of the Order of the Dannebrog